Robert Edward Thorburn Stewart (7 October 1932 – 27 September 1992) was a Scottish professional footballer who played as a right half, making nearly 150 appearances in the Scottish Football League. After retiring as a player, Stewart became a coach and was the original manager of the Scotland women's national football team.

Career

Playing career
Stewart began his Scottish Football League career at Kilmarnock in 1951, starting for Killie in the 1956–57 Scottish Cup final and final replay defeat to Falkirk. Manager Willie Waddell later tried to boost the team's forward line by handing Stewart an attacking position, but during the experiment his regular place at wing half was taken by Frank Beattie. Stewart moved on to St Mirren, where he played in their 1961–62 Scottish Cup final defeat, then Ayr United.

Coaching career
In November 1972, Stewart took charge of the Scotland women's national football team for the first ever official women's international match to take place in Britain, a 3–2 defeat to England at Ravenscraig Stadium in Greenock.

References

1932 births
1992 deaths
Association football wing halves
Ayr United F.C. players
Kilmarnock F.C. players
Scotland women's national football team managers
Scottish Junior Football Association players
Scottish Football League players
Scottish football managers
Scottish footballers
St Mirren F.C. players
Women's association football managers